Stig Frode Henriksen (born 1975) is a Norwegian actor, producer and screenwriter.

Biography 
Stig Frode Henriksen was born in 1975 in Alta, Norway.

His acting career began in 2007, with his first role in the film Kill Buljo.

Throughout his career, Henriksen has played in more than 22 films.

Filmography

As an actor

As a writer

As producer

References

External links 
 

1975 births
Living people
Norwegian male film actors
Norwegian male television actors
21st-century Norwegian male actors
Norwegian screenwriters
Norwegian film producers